Phellinus robiniae, commonly called the cracked cap polypore or Phellinus rimosus, is a fungus of the family of Hymenochaetaceae. The fungus primarily infests black locusts, aided by openings caused by Megacyllene robiniae infestation, but also grows on various other trees such as Carya, oak, and Acacia. Cracked cap polypore is sympatric with most of its hosts. It has a brown spore print, leaving brown streaks on the tree below the fungus.

References

Fungal tree pathogens and diseases
Fungi of Europe
Fungi of Asia
Fungi of North America
Fungi described in 1903
robiniae